A dying god, or departure of the gods, is a motif in mythology in which one or more gods (of a pantheon) die, are destroyed, or depart permanently from their place on Earth to elsewhere.

Frequently cited examples of dying gods are Baldr in Norse mythology. A special subcategory is the death of an entire pantheon, the most notable example being Ragnarök in Norse mythology, or Cronus and the Titans from Greek mythology, with other examples from Ireland, India, Hawaii and Tahiti. Examples of the disappearing god in Hattian and Hittite mythology include Telipinu and Hannahanna.

"Death or departure of the gods" is motif A192 in Stith Thompson's  Motif-Index of Folk-Literature, with the following subcategories:
A192.1. Death of the gods (also F259.1. Mortality of fairies)
A192.1.1. Old god slain by young god.   (also A525.2. Culture hero (god) slays his grandfather)
A192.1.2. God killed and eaten (theophagy)
A192.2. Departure of gods (also A560. Culture hero's (demi-god's) departure)
A192.2.1. Deity departs for heaven (skies). 
A192.2.1.1. Deity departs for moon.  
A192.2.2. Divinity departs in boat over sea. 
A192.2.3. Divinity departs to submarine home. 
A192.2.4. Divinity departs in column of flame. 
A192.3. Expected return of deity. 
A192.4. Divinity becomes mortal. 

A separate (although related and overlapping) category are gods who die and are also resurrected (Thompson's motif A193), see Dying-and-rising god.

See also
Death deity
Descent to the underworld
Dionysus in comparative mythology
Dying-and-rising god

References

 Burkert, Walter  1979. Structure and History in Greek Mythology and Ritual. London: University of California Press. 
 Leeming, David. "Dying god". The Oxford Companion to World mythology. Oxford University Press, 2004. Oxford Reference Online. Oxford University Press. UC - Irvine. 5 June 2011 <http://www.oxfordreference.com/views/ENTRY.html?subview=Main&entry=t208.e469>
 Stookey, Lorena Laura. 2004. Thematic Guide to World Mythology. Westport: Greenwood.

 
Comparative mythology
Mythological archetypes
Recurring elements in folklore